The Prince Edward Islands Act, 1948 (Act No. 43 of 1948) is an act of the Parliament of South Africa that annexed the Prince Edward Islands to the Union of South Africa (as it then was). The South African flag was hoisted on Marion Island and Prince Edward Island on 29 December 1947 and 4 January 1948 respectively, and a proclamation of annexation was promulgated on 24 January 1948. The annexation was confirmed by Parliament by the Prince Edward Islands Act, which was signed by the Governor-General on 1 October 1948 and came into force upon publication on 7 October.

In terms of the act, the islands are deemed to fall within the magisterial district of Cape Town and the electoral ward containing the Port of Cape Town;  this is ward 55 of the City of Cape Town. The common law applicable to the islands is defined to be the Roman-Dutch law as applied in the Cape Province. The act also extends certain other acts of Parliament to the island, and gives the Governor-General (i.e. the President) the power to extend other laws to the islands. It states that no other act will apply to the islands unless it is made to apply by such a proclamation or by the text of the act itself.

Certain provisions of the act, though not repealed, may have been superseded by the Antarctic Treaties Act, 1996 and the Antarctic Treaty System.

List of acts made applicable to the islands
Except where otherwise indicated, each act listed below was made applicable to the Prince Edward Islands expressly by its own text.
 Administration of Estates Act, 1913 (by the PEI Act)
 Justices of the Peace and Oaths Act, 1914 (by the PEI Act)
 Criminal Procedure and Evidence Act, 1917 (by the PEI Act)
 Special Justices of the Peace Act, 1918 (by the PEI Act)
 Inquests Act, 1919 (by the PEI Act)
 Magistrates' Courts Act, 1944 (by the PEI Act)
 Electoral Consolidation Act, 1946 (by the PEI Act)
 South African Citizenship Act, 1949
 Merchant Shipping Act, 1951
 Public Holidays Act, 1952
 Territorial Waters Act, 1963 (by proclamation)
 Public Holidays Amendment Act, 1973
 Sea Birds and Seals Protection Act, 1973
 Sea Fisheries Act, 1973 (by proclamation)
 Territorial Waters Amendment Act, 1977 (by proclamation)
 Fishing Industry Development Act, 1978 (by proclamation)
 Dumping at Sea Control Act, 1980
 Marine Traffic Act, 1981 (by the Shipping General Amendment Act, 1997)
 Marine Pollution (Control and Civil Liability) Act, 1981 (by the Shipping General Amendment Act, 1997)
 Carriage of Goods by Sea Act, 1986 (by the Shipping General Amendment Act, 1997)
 Marine Pollution (Prevention of Pollution from Ships) Act, 1986 (by the International Convention for the Prevention of Pollution from Ships Amendment Act, 1996)
 Marine Pollution (Intervention) Act, 1987 (by the Shipping General Amendment Act, 1997)
 Sea Fishery Act, 1988
 Environment Conservation Act, 1989
 Maritime Zones Act, 1994
 South African Citizenship Act, 1995
 Antarctic Treaties Act, 1996
 Wreck and Salvage Act, 1996
 South African Maritime Safety Authority Act, 1998
 Marine Living Resources Act, 1998
 Ship Registration Act, 1998
 Sea Transport Documents Act, 2000
 National Environmental Management: Protected Areas Act, 2003
 National Environmental Management: Biodiversity Act, 2004
 National Environmental Management: Integrated Coastal Management Act, 2007
 Merchant Shipping (Safe Containers Convention) Act, 2011
 Merchant Shipping (International Oil Pollution Compensation Fund) Act, 2013
 Merchant Shipping (Civil Liability Convention) Act, 2013
 Marine Spatial Planning Act, 2018

External links
 

South African legislation
1948 in South African law
Prince Edward Islands